Dato' Haji Taib Azamudden Md Taib (born 19 October 1951) is a Malaysian politician of Pan-Malaysian Islamic Party (PAS). Taib was the Member of the Parliament of Malaysia for the Baling constituency in Kedah for two separate terms; from 1999 to 2004 and from 2008 to 2013. He sat in Parliament as a member of the opposition PAS.

Prior to joining PAS in politic, Taib was the imam of the National Mosque of Malaysia from 1993 to 1999.

Taib entered Parliament in the 1999 general election, winning the Baling constituency in Kedah. In the 2004 general election, he was one of many PAS parliamentarians to lost their seat, being defeated by Mashitah Ibrahim of the ruling Barisan Nasional coalition. He regained the Baling seat in the 2008 general election, defeating the Barisan Nasional's Abdul Azeez Abdul Rahim.

Taib suffered a stroke in 2013 and did not re-contest his seat in the general election later that year.

Election results

See also
Baling (federal constituency)

References

Living people
1951 births
People from Kedah
Malaysian Islamic Party politicians
Malaysian people of Malay descent
Malaysian Muslims
Members of the Dewan Rakyat
Malaysian imams